In enzymology, a perillyl-alcohol dehydrogenase is an enzyme that catalyzes the chemical reaction

perillyl alcohol + NAD+  perillyl aldehyde + NADH + H+

Thus, the two substrates of this enzyme are perillyl alcohol and NAD+, whereas its 3 products are perillyl aldehyde, NADH, and H+.

This enzyme belongs to the family of oxidoreductases, specifically those acting on the CH-OH group of donor with NAD+ or NADP+ as acceptor. The systematic name of this enzyme class is perillyl-alcohol:NAD+ oxidoreductase. This enzyme is also called perillyl alcohol dehydrogenase. This enzyme participates in limonene and pinene degradation.

References

 

EC 1.1.1
NADH-dependent enzymes
Enzymes of unknown structure